Crash Zone is an Australian children's science fiction television series which aired on the Seven Network from 13 February 1999 to 25 August 2001. It was produced by Australian Children's Television Foundation, in association with the Disney Channel, and ran for 26 episodes. The series stars five high school students, "high-tech whiz kids" of varied backgrounds, who are hired by the president of the Catalyst software company to save her failing business. The premise of the series was unique in that it was one of the first series to examine the early use of the internet as well as the video game industry and artificial intelligence.

Plot
Mike Hansen (Nikolai Nikolaeff), Alison 'Pi' Renfrey (Cassandra Magrath), Rebecca 'Bec' Chan (Frances Wang), Marcello Di Campili (Paul Pantano) and Abraham 'Ram' Foley (Damien Bodie) are five Melbourne high school students who all have a strong interest in computers, online gaming and the internet. While playing an online computer game, they each discover a coded message. The message prompts them to follow a series of clues that eventually leads them to a meeting with Alexandra Davis (Nicki Wendt), president of the software company Catalyst.

Confessing that she was the author of the messages, Davis reveals to the teenagers that her company is struggling and she would like to hire one of the teens as game testers in order to design games for her company at "The Crash Zone". Davis proposes a competition in which the winner takes the job, and while the competition is fierce, she is impressed by their teamwork and offers them all positions in the company. The one exception is Ram, who she feels is too young, but who is allowed to remain with the teens. As well as the developing friendships with each other and their social lives, the teenagers also discover Virgil (Matt Parkinson), a mysterious artificial intelligence which exists on the internet.

The second series has the teenagers returning from their summer vacations to find the financial situation at Catalyst to have become much more serious. Davis has been forced to lay off most of her staff and they may be next. Two new characters are introduced in the second series, 12-year-old Penny Gallagher and her father Matthew Gallagher. Penny Gallagher, who is befriended by Ram, persuades her father to offer Davis a deal to save Catalyst from bankruptcy. Although knowing very little about the video game industry, Matthew Gallagher is a very successful businessman and very quickly turns the company around. However, his changes often results in conflict between him and the staff.

Characters
 Alison 'Pi' Renfrey (Cassandra Magrath) - The daughter of a highly popular actor and is usually regarded as the richest of the group. She is beautiful, spirited and occasionally rude. In season 2 Pi and Mike start dating.
 Marcello Di Campili (Paul Pantano) - Of Italian ancestry, he has high hopes of becoming super rich one day and often gets into trouble as a result of his various shady dealings. He is lively, humorous and comical.
 Abraham 'Ram' Foley (Damien Bodie) - The second youngest of the group but is the most creative and technically intelligent of the group. He remains one of Mike's best friends from the first.
 Rebecca 'Bec' Chan (Frances Wang) - Bec is of Chinese descent and is often portrayed as an intelligent, highly successful academic student. She is popular with the Catalyst staff.
 Mike Hansen (Nikolai Nikolaeff) - Mike is probably the oldest of the group and the most successful game designer and tester. He often assumes control of the group when things go wrong. He is also the funniest of the group and is patient and quick-thinking.
 Alexandra Davis (Nicky Wendt) - She is the president of Catalyst. 
 Nigel Hartford (Richard Moss) - He is Alexandra's assistant. 
 Virgil Reality (Matt Parkinson) - Originally a "Buggy" Artificial intelligence experiment created by Alex when she was working for Sunjim. Virgil was "born" when Alex trashed the AI 2000 program when she couldn't get it to work properly. The remains floated about the internet like a ghost before forming the AI Virgil who spent the next few years wandering the internet before appearing in the Catalyst network server where he met the Crash Zone team and subsequently met his creator Alex. The name 'Virgil' is given to him by Mike.
 Penny Gallagher (Heidi Valkenburg) - She is the youngest of the group at twelve yet she is quick and computer savvy and has produced ingenious creations. She is introduced to Catalyst by Ram.
 Matthew Gallagher (Jeremy Stanford) - He is the father of Penny and a very successful businessman.

Episodes

Series One (1999)

Series Two (2001)

Reception
The series was the first collaboration with the Australian Children's Television Foundation and the Disney Channel. It proved a very successful show and eventually aired in Canada, Sri Lanka the United Kingdom as well. The series was nominated for several awards including the Australian Film Institute Awards, Prix Jeunesse and the New York Film Festival. It was also given honorable mention at The Chris Awards and was an official selection at the Prix Danube, the Chicago International Children's Film Festival and The Museum of Television and Radio.

In 1999, series producer Patricia Edgar was nominated by the Australian Film Institute for "Best Children's Television Drama", specifically its first episode "The Dream Team". Esben Storm was also nominated for "Best Direction in a Television Drama" for directing its first episode. Edgar was again nominated to receive "Best Children's Television Drama", along with Bernadette O'Mahony, for their work on the episode "Skin Deep" in 2001. It was also nominated for Most Outstanding Children's Program at the 2001 and 2002 Logie Awards.

A novel based on the series was written by Amanda Midlam and released in 2001.

References

Further reading
 Edgar, Patricia. Bloodbath: A Memoir of Australian Television. Melbourne: Melbourne University Publishing, 2006. 
 Gough, Noel. "Teaching in the (Crash) zone: manifesting cultural studies." Deakin Centre for Education and Change. Australian Association for Research in Education. 15 July 2009. <https://web.archive.org/web/20091003183940/http://www.aare.edu.au/99pap/gou99688.htm>.
 Gough, Noel. "Locations, liminalities and literacies: science education in The Crash Zone (and other heterotopian spaces)." (Post)modern Science (Education): Propositions and Alternative Paths. New York: Peter Lang, 2001. 249-73. La Trobe University. 15 July 2009. <https://web.archive.org/web/20090108114633/http://www.latrobe.edu.au/oent/Staff/gough_papers/noelg_CrashZone_2001_final.pdf>.

External links
 
Crash Zone at Australian Screen Online

1999 Australian television series debuts
2001 Australian television series endings
Australian children's television series
Australian science fiction television series
Seven Network original programming
Television series about teenagers
Television shows about video games
Television shows set in Melbourne